Wet Zoo is an EP released by Annuals.  Released on April 1, 2008 under Sony imprint label Cavansback Music.  The EP was split with Annuals sister band, Sunfold.  It served as a stop-gap between Be He Me and Such Fun

Track listing

References

2008 albums